The Namdapha flying squirrel (Biswamoyopterus biswasi)  is an arboreal, nocturnal flying squirrel endemic to Arunachal Pradesh in northeast India, where it is known from a single specimen collected in Namdapha National Park in 1981. No population estimate is available for B. biswasi, but the known habitat is tall Mesua ferrea jungles, often on hill slopes in the catchment area of Dihing River (particularly on the western slope of Patkai range) in northeastern India.

It was the sole member in the genus Biswamoyopterus until the description of the Laotian giant flying squirrel (Biswamoyopterus laoensis) in 2013. In 2018, Quan Li from the Kunming Institute of Zoology at the Chinese Academy of Sciences discovered a new squirrel in the same genus while studying specimens in their collection, called the Mount Gaoligong flying squirrel (Biswamoyopterus gaoligongensis), based on the region it was discovered in.

Description
Biswamoyopterus biswasi has reddish, grizzled fur with white above. Its crown is pale grey, its patagium is orangish and its underparts are white.

The cheek teeth of B. biswasi are simple, and its incisors are unpigmented. Septae are multiple in auditory bullae and sometimes honeycomb-shaped with 10 to 12 cells in it.

The scientific name commemorates Biswamoy Biswas, director of the Zoological Survey of India.

Status
The Namdapha flying squirrel is listed as critically endangered by the IUCN. It is known from a single specimen collected in 1981 in Namdapha National Park. Its range of the Namdapha flying squirrel may be restricted to a single valley and it is threatened by poaching of animals for food from within the park, and possibly by habitat destruction. It is among the 25 "most wanted lost" species that are the focus of Global Wildlife Conservation's "Search for Lost Species" initiative.

There are several later reports of sightings by tourists and local researches, but a review by scientists specialising in flying squirrels found that most—if not all—have been the result of confusion with other, more common species that occur in Namdapha National Park, especially the rather similar candidula red giant flying squirrel (Petaurista petaurista candidula).

References

Biswamoyopterus
Endemic fauna of India
Rodents of India
Environment of Arunachal Pradesh
Critically endangered fauna of Asia
Mammals described in 1981
Species known from a single specimen